Piotr Bikont (12 May 1955 – 27 June 2017) was a Polish journalist, publicist, culinary critic and a theatre director.

Bikont translated Art Spiegelman's graphic novel Maus to Polish. He was a member of editorial staff of the talking magazine Gadający Pies based in Kraków, and the author of a book Jewish Cooking According to Balbina Przepiórko.

Bikont was married to journalist Anna Bikont, co-founder and editor of Tygodnik Mazowsze and Gazeta Wyborcza. He died on 27 June 2017, in a car accident.  He was 62.

He was married to publicist Anna Bikont, with whom he had two children, Maniucha Bikont, an anthropologist and artist, and Aleksandra Bikont.

References

1955 births
2017 deaths
Polish journalists
Polish food writers
Road incident deaths in Poland
People from Poznań